The Plum River is a tributary of the Mississippi River, about  long, in northwestern Illinois in the United States. It rises in Jo Daviess County and flows generally south-southwestwardly into Carroll County, where it joins the Mississippi at Savanna. Among its several short tributaries are:
 The East Plum River, which rises in Stephenson County and flows southwestwardly into Carroll County, joining the Plum at 
 The Muddy Plum River, which flows for its entire length in Jo Daviess County. It joins the Plum River at 
The Middle Fork Plum River joins the Plum River at 
The North Fork Plum River has its confluence with the Plum River at

See also
List of Illinois rivers

References

Columbia Gazetteer of North America entry
DeLorme (2003).  Illinois Atlas & Gazetteer.  Yarmouth, Maine: DeLorme.  .

Rivers of Illinois
Tributaries of the Mississippi River
Rivers of Carroll County, Illinois
Rivers of Jo Daviess County, Illinois
Rivers of Stephenson County, Illinois